Eriogonum nortonii is a species of wild buckwheat known by the common name Pinnacles buckwheat. This small annual herb is endemic to California where it is known mainly from a few occurrences around the border between Monterey and San Benito Counties. It is sometimes seen on the protected land of Pinnacles National Park.

Description
This plant grows between 5 to 20 centimeters in height, with a thread-thin branched stem which is often red in color. Most of the leaves are 0.5 to 1.0 cm long and rounded, fuzzy underneath and wavy-edged. Tiny clusters of very light to deep pink flowers grow on minute erect stalks.

External links
Jepson Manual Treatment
Photo gallery

References 

nortonii
Endemic flora of California
Natural history of the California chaparral and woodlands
Natural history of the California Coast Ranges
~
~
Natural history of San Benito County, California
Natural history of Monterey County, California